Kürdlər (also, Kurdlar and Kurtlar) is a village in the Agdam District of Azerbaijan.

Notable natives 

 Aliabbas Isgandarov — National Hero of Azerbaijan.

References 

Populated places in Aghdam District